The Alexander McMillan House is a historic home located at 7703 Strawberry Plains Pike in Knox County, Tennessee, United States.  It was constructed in 1785 by Alexander McMillan (1749–1837), an early Knox County pioneer.

He built the house in 1785. An addition was made on its front side in 1810 and a third room was added in 1860. The home was owned by his descendants until the middle of the 20th century.

The house was listed on the National Register of Historic Places in 2001.

Alexander McMillan
Of Scottish descent, his family migrated to Ulster, Ireland. Alexander was born on August 12, 1749, in County Londonderry, Ireland. In 1775, he emigrated to Boston in the American colonies. He then joined the Continental Army and participated in the Battle against Quebec in 1776.

He traveled to what is now Washington County, Virginia to meet up with relatives who emigrated before him. In 1778, he married his first cousin, Martha McMillan (1762-1836), the daughter of William and Mary Leeper McMillan. William was Alexander's uncle the father of William McMillan.

He completed his service at the military with the Battle of Kings Mountain on October 7, 1780. McMillan and his wife settled in the eastern part of Tennessee.

At 63 years of age, he volunteered to serve during the War of 1812 and fought with General Andrew Jackson in the Battle of New Orleans. He lived near McMillan's Station, an East Tennessee and Virginia Railroad station 10 miles from Knoxville, Tennessee, and died in 1837. His wife Martha died in 1836. He is buried on a farm near the Old Caledonia church.

References

Houses completed in 1785
Houses in Knox County, Tennessee
Houses on the National Register of Historic Places in Tennessee
National Register of Historic Places in Knoxville, Tennessee